Zbigniew Baranowski (born 2 July 1991 in Białogard) is a Polish wrestler who competed at the 2016 Summer Olympics.

He took silver at the 2016 Dan Kolov & Nikola Petrov international wrestling tournament.

At the 2016 World Wrestling Olympic Qualification Tournament 1 he lost in the quarterfinals to eventual winner J'den Cox.  However, due to Cox making the finals, he was able to compete in the Repechage where he won both a bronze medal and the final Olympic qualifying spot in the tournament 4-3.

He has been ranked as high as 19th in the world.

In 2020, he won the silver medal in the men's 86 kg event at the Individual Wrestling World Cup held in Belgrade, Serbia.

In 2022, he won one of the bronze medals in the 97 kg event at the European Wrestling Championships held in Budapest, Hungary. He competed in the 97kg event at the 2022 World Wrestling Championships held in Belgrade, Serbia.

References

External links 
 

Polish male sport wrestlers
1991 births
Living people
People from Białogard
Olympic wrestlers of Poland
Wrestlers at the 2016 Summer Olympics
Wrestlers at the 2019 European Games
European Games competitors for Poland
European Wrestling Championships medalists
21st-century Polish people